Anthony New (1747 – March 2, 1833) was an 18th-century and 19th-century American  congressman and lawyer from Virginia and Kentucky.

Biography
Born in Gloucester County, Virginia, New completed preparatory studies, studied law and was admitted to the bar. During the Revolutionary War, he served as a colonel in the Virginia militia from 1780 to 1781.

He was elected an Anti-Administration to the United States House of Representatives in 1792, serving from 1793 to 1805. New moved to Elkton, Kentucky, and was elected back to the House Democratic-Republican from Kentucky in 1810, serving from 1811 to 1813. He was elected back a third time in 1816, serving from 1817 to 1819 and a fourth time in 1820, serving from 1821 to 1823. Afterwards, he engaged in agricultural pursuits and died at his estate called "Dunheath" near Elkton, Kentucky, on March 2, 1833, and was interred in the family cemetery on the estate.

References
 Retrieved on February 28, 2010
 Retrieved on February 28, 2010
 

1747 births
1833 deaths
Members of the United States House of Representatives from Kentucky
Virginia lawyers
Kentucky lawyers
Virginia militiamen in the American Revolution
Kentucky Democratic-Republicans
Democratic-Republican Party members of the United States House of Representatives from Virginia
People from Gloucester County, Virginia
18th-century American politicians
18th-century American lawyers
19th-century American politicians
People from Todd County, Kentucky
19th-century American lawyers